The women's singles table tennis event was a part of the table tennis programme at the 2012 Summer Olympics in London. The event took place from Saturday 28 July to Wednesday 1 August 2012 at ExCeL London. The tournament was a single elimination tournament with a third place playoff played between the two losing semi-finalists.

The draw was conducted on 25 July 2012.

Qualification

Schedule
All times are British Summer Time (UTC+1).

Seeds
Seeds were based on the ITTF World Ranking lists published in July 2012. The top 16 seeded players qualified directly to the third round.

  (final, silver medalist)
  (champion, gold medalist)
  (quarterfinals)
  (semifinals, fourth place)
  (quarterfinals)
  (semifinals, bronze medalist)
  (third round)
  (quarterfinals)
  (fourth round)
  (fourth round)
  (quarterfinals)
  (fourth round)
  (fourth round)
  (fourth round)
  (fourth round)
  (fourth round)

The players ranked from 17 to 32 qualified directly to the second round.

  (second round)
  (third round)
  (second round)
  (third round)
  (third round)
  (third round)
  (third round)
  (fourth round)
  (third round)
  (third round)
  (third round)
  (third round)
  (third round)
  (third round)
  (third round)
  (third round)

Draw

Finals

Top half

Section 1

Section 2

Bottom half

Section 3

Section 4

Preliminary rounds

Top half

Section 1

Section 2

Bottom half

Section 3

Section 4

References

External links
 London 2012 Olympic Games: The Official Report. The London Organising Committee of the Olympic Games and Paralympic Games. (2013).
 
 2012 Summer Olympics / Table Tennis / Singles, Women. Olympedia.

Women's singles
Olymp
Women's events at the 2012 Summer Olympics